Manuel Alejandro De la Torre Urbina (born June 13, 1980, in Mexico City) is a  former Mexican football defender.

Career
De la Torre began playing football as a defender with Club Universidad Nacional's youth sides. He progressed to Pumas' senior side where he played in the Mexican Primera División until 2004.

He signed with Deportivo Toluca F.C. and would win four league titles with the club. In February 2011, he was named a member of Toluca's Hall of Fame.

Honors
Toluca
Primera División de México (3): Apertura 2005, Apertura 2008, Primera División de México Bicentenario 2010

UANL
 Copa MX (1): Clausura 2014

References

External links

1980 births
Living people
Association football defenders
Footballers from Mexico City
Liga MX players
Club Universidad Nacional footballers
Deportivo Toluca F.C. players
Tigres UANL footballers
Mexican footballers